Aïn Zitoun  is a town and commune in Oum El Bouaghi Province, Algeria. According to the 1998 census it has a population of 5993.

Localities  of the commune 
The commune is composed of 9 localities:

References 

Communes of Oum El Bouaghi Province